Chetan Pratap Singh Chauhan (21 July 1947 – 16 August 2020) was a cricketer who played 40 Test matches for India. He played Ranji Trophy for Maharashtra and Delhi. He played most of his international cricket in the late 1970s and was the regular opening partner of Sunil Gavaskar during that period.
Chetan Chauhan was appointed Chairman of NIFT (National Institute of Fashion Technology) from June 2016 to June 2017. He was also twice elected to the Lok Sabha from Amroha in Uttar Pradesh, in 1991 and 1998. From 2018 to 2020, he was minister for youth and sports in the state of Uttar Pradesh, India.

On 12 July 2020, he was admitted to the hospital after testing positive for COVID-19. He died due to complications and multiple organ failure on 16 August 2020 at the age of 73.

Early days
Chauhan was born in Uttar Pradesh in a Hindu Rajput family. Then he moved to Pune in Maharashtra in 1960 where his father, an army officer, was transferred. He took his bachelor's degrees at Wadia College in Pune. There he was coached by the former Maharashtra player Kamal Bhandarkar. Chauhan represented Pune University in the Rohinton Baria Trophy in 1966–67 and was selected to represent West Zone for the interzonal Vizzy Trophy in the same season. He scored 103 against North Zone and 88 & 63 against South Zone in the final. His opening partner in the second innings was Sunil Gavaskar.

More success in the Vizzy trophy in 1967 led to his selection in the Maharashtra Ranji team. Chauhan's first hundred came next year when he was first in and last out against Bombay on a rain affected wicket where the first six wickets fell for 52. He scored 103 against South Zone in the Duleep Trophy final against five Test bowlers and was selected to play for India in 1969–70.

Test cricket 
Chauhan made his Test debut against New Zealand at the Bombay. He took 25 minutes to score his first run, a square cut for four off Bruce Taylor. His next scoring shot was a hook for six off the same bowler. Chauhan was dropped after two Tests, made an appearance against Australia later in the season, failed, and was dropped again for three years.

Chauhan scored 873 runs in the 1972–73 Ranji season for Maharashtra which was then the second highest aggregate for a season. This included double hundreds in consecutive matches against Gujarat and Vidarbha. Chauhan and Madhu Gupte shared an opening stand of 405 in the latter match. In between the double hundreds, he played two Tests against England. He failed and did not play a Test for another five years.

He moved to Delhi and the North Zone in 1975. One appearance against Sri Lanka in an unofficial Test ended in failure. In 1976–77, he scored 158 against Haryana (with a fractured jaw), 200 v Punjab, 147 v Karnataka and 150 against the Central Zone. Another Duleep trophy hundred early in the next season found him a place in the team to Australia.

Comeback
Chauhan scored 157 against Victoria in his first match of the tour. It took him 516 minutes and included just two fours. Paul Hibbert of Victoria had scored a hundred earlier in the match without a single boundary. Chauhan returned to the Indian team for the second Test at Perth and hit 88 in his very first innings. From then he missed only one Test until the end of his career and, except for one occasion, opened with Gavaskar every time. At Lahore against Pakistan they added 192, and 117 & 153 against West Indies at Bombay.

In England in 1979, they put on 213 in the second innings at The Oval when India missed the target of 438 by nine runs. Against Australia in 1980–81, Chauhan scored 249 runs in three Tests to Gavaskar's 118. He missed a hundred by three runs in Adelaide. At Melbourne in the next Test, he scored 85 and added 165 with Gavaskar before the latter was given out lbw to Dennis Lillee. Gavaskar, the captain, disputed the decision on the way out and ordered Chauhan to leave the field with him. An embarrassing situation was avoided when the Indian manager Wing Cmdr. Shahid Durrani persuaded Chauhan to return. Touring New Zealand after the trip to Australia, Chauhan scored 78 in the second Test and 36 & 7 in the third.

Later years
Chauhan was dropped after the tour and never selected for another Test match. He added 3022 runs with Gavaskar in their 59 opening stands, ten of which were over 100. He scored 2084 runs in his career with 16 fifties but without a century. His last first class match was the Ranji final against Bombay in 1985 where he scored 98 and 54 with a fractured finger. He also served as the Cricket coach of Indian team.

Chauhan received the Arjuna award in 1981.

Career in politics
Chauhan was a member of the Bharatiya Janata Party. He was a member of the Lok Sabha (lower house of the parliament) from Amroha in 1991 and 1998. He lost the elections from the same constituency in 1996, 1999 and 2004, finishing fourth on the last occasion. He then also made his comeback in the politics by defeating Alley Hasan of Bahujan Samaj Party in 1998 General Elections by defeating him by more than 35,000 votes. In 2017 he was elected to Uttar Pradesh Vidhan Sabha from Naugawan Sadat (Assembly constituency), and made a minister in Chief Minister Yogi Adityanath's government.

Accomplishments
 Chauhan was the first Test cricketer to finish his Test career with over 2000 runs but without a century. As of 13 February 2022, Shane Warne (3154 runs) and Niroshan Dickwella (2443 runs) are the only other players with a similar record.
 Chauhan had 11 century stands with Gavaskar but one of them was for the fourth wicket. At Bombay against the West Indies in 1978–79 they opened together, but Chauhan retired early in the innings and came back at the fall of the third wicket.

Death 
In July 2020, Chauhan tested positive for COVID-19 during the COVID-19 pandemic in India, and a month later he was placed on a ventilator following multiple organ failure. On 16 August 2020, he died in Gurugram at the age of 73.

References

Sources
 Sujit Mukherjee, Matched Winners, Orient Longman (1996), p 105-119
 Indian Express, 26 September 1969

External links
 
 Indian parliamentary biography
 Results of the Amroha elections

|-

|-

1947 births
2020 deaths
Delhi cricketers
Indian cricketers
India One Day International cricketers
India Test cricketers
North Zone cricketers
Maharashtra cricketers
West Zone cricketers
Uttar Pradesh MLAs 2017–2022
Bharatiya Janata Party politicians from Uttar Pradesh
People from Amroha district
People from Bareilly
Cricketers from Uttar Pradesh
Recipients of the Arjuna Award
Indian sportsperson-politicians
India MPs 1991–1996
India MPs 1998–1999
Lok Sabha members from Uttar Pradesh
Yogi ministry
State cabinet ministers of Uttar Pradesh
Deaths from the COVID-19 pandemic in India
Deaths from multiple organ failure